The National Archive and Library of Bolivia are located in Sucre. The institution was established in 1836. Its collections has 114,000 volumes.

See also 
 List of national archives
 List of national libraries

References

External links 
 http://www.nationallibraryofbolivia.org

Bolivia
Bolivian culture
Libraries in Bolivia
Archives in Bolivia
Sucre
Buildings and structures in Chuquisaca Department
Libraries established in 1836
1836 establishments in Bolivia